Paradero is a small town in the Valverde of the Dominican Republic in the northwest of the country. Some 102 mi (or 163 km) North-West of Santo Domingo, the country's capital.

See also

Valverde Province
Cibao region
List of municipalities of the Dominican Republic
Mao, Dominican Republic
Jicomé

Populated places in Valverde Province